The Audi A3 is a subcompact executive/small family car (C-segment) manufactured and marketed by the German automaker Audi AG since September 1996,  currently in its fourth generation.

The first two generations of the Audi A3 were based on the Volkswagen Group A platform, while the third and fourth generations use the Volkswagen Group MQB platform.

First generation (Typ 8L; 1996)

The original A3 (or Type 8L) was announced back in June 1995, but introduced first in the European market for more than year in September 1996, marking Audi's return to the production of smaller cars following the demise of the Audi 50 in 1978. This was the first Volkswagen Group model to use the "PQ34" or "A4" platform, bearing a close resemblance to the contemporary Volkswagen Golf Mk4, which arrived a year later. Within three years, this platform was used for total of seven cars.

The A3 was initially available only with a three-door hatchback body, to present a more sporty image than the Golf, in both front and four-wheel drive. The inline four-cylinder engines were transversely mounted. The Audi A3 was the eighth model in the Audi lineup to use five valves per cylinder. The dashboard was also used by the first generation SEAT León and second generation SEAT Toledo.

The United Kingdom market first received the Audi A3 in November 1996.

In 1999 Audi expanded the range with the introduction of more powerful versions: a 1.8 turbo rated , and a 1.9 TDI diesel engine with unit injector "Pumpe Düse" (PD) technology and variable geometry turbocharger. Also in 1999, Audi also introduced a five-door body.

In late 2000 the A3 range was revised with new headlights and rear lamps, other minor cosmetic changes, an improved interior, and the introduction of a six-speed manual gearbox, on the  1.8 Turbo and the new  1.9 TDI.

Audi's electronic stability control, traction-control, and brake force distribution computer became standard equipment in some countries.

Although the first-generation Audi A3 was replaced in Europe in 2003, the first generation model continued to be sold in some markets. Production of the first generation model stopped in Brazil in 2006.

Safety

Euro NCAP rating of 4 out of 5 stars. Their evaluation concluded "the column lock, adjuster lever and bracket presented hazards in the knee impact area for the driver. These could cause high loads on his upper legs and damage to his knees." The A3 also provides almost no protection to pedestrians, giving it two stars out of a possible four.

S3 (1999–2003)

Audi released the A3-derived Audi S3 in 1999, only as a three-door hatchback. Early models (1999–2001) had . The engine had a maximum of  torque. This was the first time a small four-cylinder engine had been used in an Audi S-series car.

Although dubbed "quattro", the S3 uses a different four-wheel drive system. The Haldex Traction coupling adjusts the bias of torque distribution from the front to rear axle as grip requirements change – most of the time it operates as a front-wheel drive.

The S3 was sold in Europe, Japan, Mexico, South Africa, Australia, and New Zealand.

The S3 was given a facelift in 2002, where it was given one-piece headlights/indicator units, different front wings, rear lights clusters, and some minor upgrades to interior trim.

Standard features include xenon HID headlamps with high pressure washers and auto levelers, front fog lamps, 17" "Avus" alloy wheels with 225/45R17 tyres, electrically adjustable Recaro leather seats, climate control, alarm and electronic stability control with traction control.

Options include a Bose sound system, boot/trunk or in-dash mounted 6-disc CD changer, metallic paint, 18-inch 9-spoke RSTT wheels, glass sunroof, centre arm rest, privacy glass (B-pillar backwards), auto-dimming rear-view mirror, parking assist, luggage net, heated front seats, cruise control, aluminium door mirror casings and part leather/Alcantara (blue/silver/yellow) combination seat coverings. These items are standard in some export markets.

Engines
The engines used are the same as those for many other cars in the Volkswagen Group.

Second generation (Typ 8P; 2003)

Initial release
At the 2003 Geneva Motor Show, Audi launched the second generation of the A3, the Typ 8P, designed by Gary Telaak during 2000 (however, the final design was frozen in 2001). Originally launched only as a three-door hatchback with four-cylinder engines, it featured a new automobile platform (the PQ35 platform), a redesigned and more spacious interior, new petrol engines with Fuel Stratified Injection (FSI), and standard six-speed manual gearboxes (except on the base 1.6 petrol and 1.9 diesel).

In 2005 the "S line" trim level, offering new decorative elements, became available and the three-door A3 received the same front-end styling features as the Sportback model. For the first time, the A3 became available in the North American market, exclusively with the Sportback body, with the base 2.0 inline-four FSI introduced in 2005 as a 2006 model, and the 3.2 VR6 Quattro following.

A3 Sportback (2004–2013)
The five-door "Sportback" model was introduced in June 2004. The A3 Sportback is  longer than the base three-door body, and includes improved rear cabin space and a larger luggage compartment (370 litres). It also received the new "single frame" front grille originally introduced in the A8 W12, which was later adopted across the whole A3 range.

S3 (2006–2013)

In August 2006, Audi introduced the second generation S3. As with all Audi S models, the design was done in-house by quattro GmbH. The engine features uprated high-performance pistons, revised boost/fuel mapping, increased turbocharger size (KKK K04) and larger intercooler. Audi offers both six-speed manual and six-speed S-Tronic automatic transmissions with the S3.

The spring ratings and dampers were revised, along with the body kit. Like its predecessor, although badged a "Quattro" model, the S3 does not employ a Torsen centre differential (as in other common Quattro models), but instead uses the Swedish Haldex Traction system in its on-demand four-wheel drive transmission, due to the transverse engine layout.

Safety

Euro NCAP tested a second-generation Audi A3 with front airbags, side airbags, seatbelt pretensioners, and load limiters as standard. Despite Audi increasing the protection inside the car for the driver and passengers, pedestrian safety actually got 33% worse compared to the first generation and Euro NCAP gave criticism for the car offering virtually no protection at all on the front end and scoring just one star from a possible four. "A poor result for a new car" was the verdict given for pedestrian safety after the test.

2008 facelift
Audi introduced a number of changes to the A3 and S3 in 2008. These include revised nose and tail styling, with a modified grille and daytime running lights, common rail 2.0 TDI engines, seven-speed S tronic dual clutch transmission availability for the smaller non-U.S. engines, and optional "magnetic ride" adaptive shock absorbers. In addition, the range now includes an S3 Sportback model.

Also, a cabriolet version was introduced. It was similar in dimensions to the 3-door version, with a two-box design.

Audi A3 TDI Clubsport quattro (2008)
Audi A3 TDI Clubsport quattro is a concept car unveiled in 2008. Based on the Audi A3 three-door, it is an approach by Audi to address both performance and the environment.

It uses the quattro drive system with a six-speed manual transmission.

The chassis has Audi's Magnetic Ride Suspension system, lowering the vehicle  from the base model. It also has ceramic front brakes, a four-link rear suspension and electro-mechanical servo assist for the rack and pinion steering.

Exterior modifications include the widening of the three-door's grill, modifying the odd, and enlarging air intakes. Bolt-on fender flares and a large rear spoiler have been added. The interior changes include sport seats and a flat-bottomed steering wheel.

RS 3 Sportback (2011–2012)

Optional features included front bucket seats, roof rails in matte aluminum look, styling packages in black or matte aluminum.

First deliveries started in early 2011.

A3 Cabriolet Sport and S line Final Edition (2013–)
The A3 Cabriolet Sport Final Edition is a version of the A3 Cabriolet Sport model for the UK market, commemorating the end of the A3 Cabriolet's production run. It included Vienna leather upholstery, front seat heating, rear parking sensors, automatic headlight and wiper activation, cruise control, a Bluetooth mobile phone interface.

S line Final Edition is based on the A3 Cabriolet Sport Final Edition model, with 18-inch S line alloy wheel with a new five-segment spoke design, full Vienna leather upholstery, S line safety and entertainment features with xenon plus headlights with LED daytime running lamps, DVD-based satellite-navigation, Audi Music Interface iPod connection, a BOSE sound system.

Engines
In January 2007, the naturally-aspirated 2.0 FSI was replaced by a new turbocharged 1.8 TFSI engine rated . It is available in front-wheel drive only.

In late 2007, Audi introduced a new  1.4 L TFSI engine for the A3, replacing the 1.6 L FSI engine, and a new diesel "e"-model. The "e"-model, Audi's equivalent of Volkswagen's BlueMotion, is available with the 1.9 L TDI engine, and offers a more ecological car, with a CO2 emission below 120 g/km.

Audi released two models of the A3 1.6 TDI for the European market. The first uses Audi's start/stop and energy recovery system, and produces . The second engine does not use the same efficiency systems and will produce  will get . They went on sale in June 2009.

In 2009, the 1.6 L eight-valve petrol engine was replaced by a turbocharged 1.2 TFSI engine already found in VW's Polo and Golf models.

The A3 2.0 TDI clean diesel is a version of Audi's A3 2.0 TDI for the North American market, making it the second Audi TDI vehicle sold in North America, following the Audi Q7 TDI in 2008. It is a FWD vehicle with S-Tronic transmission with Hill-hold assist, Sirius satellite radio, Leather seats and steering wheel, Auxiliary audio input, Dual-zone climate control,  alloy wheels. The vehicle was unveiled at the 2009 North American International Auto Show. This US model would begin sale in the first quarter of 2010 as a 2010 model year vehicle.

The 2.0 TDI engine was included in the engines found by the United States Environmental Protection Agency to use software intentionally designed to turn off emission control systems except when undergoing emission testing. Models made from 2009 to 2015 were affected.

Third generation (Typ 8V; 2013)

The vehicle was unveiled at the 2012 Geneva Motor Show and went on sale in Europe in September 2012.

First vehicle using the flexible modular Volkswagen Group MQB platform, the third generation is available as a three-door hatchback, a five-door "Sportback", a four-door saloon to directly rival the Mercedes-Benz CLA-Class, and a two-door Cabriolet.

The front suspension is a MacPherson strut set-up while the rear utilizes torsion bar suspension (models with less than 150 PS) or multi-link rear suspension (models with 150 PS or more).

The features include:
Multi-collision brake: Emergency braking function stops the car after the first impact, to prevent secondary collisions
Multi Media Interface MMI entertainment system (Tegra 3 processor) with handwriting recognition
4G broadband internet
adaptive cruise control
Pre sense front/basic radar-guided collision avoidance system
active lane assist
side assist

Early German models include 1.4 TFSI (122 PS), 1.8 TFSI (180 PS), and 2.0 TDI (150 PS). 1.2 TFSI (105 PS), 1.4 TFSI (140 PS), 1.8 TFSI quattro (180 PS), 1.6 TDI (105 PS), and 2.0 TDI quattro (150 PS) were added in 2013.

A3 1.2 TFSI (105 PS) was added to the UK market in 2013, followed by A3 1.4 TFSI (140 PS) in 2013.

For the 2020 model year, the vehicle is exclusively built at the Ingolstadt plant, as opposed to previous model years where sedans and convertibles were built at the Győr plant.

A3 Sedan (2013–2020)

The A3 Sedan includes a body  wider and  lower than that of the A3 Sportback. Other features include 16- to 18-inch-wheels (optional 19-inch wheels via quattro GmbH) and electronic stabilization control with electronic differential lock.

The vehicle was unveiled at the 2013 New York Auto Show.

The German model went on sale in late summer 2013. Early models include 1.4 TFSI (140 PS), 1.8 TFSI (180 PS), and 2.0 TDI (150 PS).

Delivery of the UK models began in autumn of 2013. Early models include 1.4 TFSI (140 PS), 1.8 TFSI (180 PS), and 2.0 TDI (150 PS).

In international markets like Pakistan, Audi has introduced it with a 1.2 TFSI engine. This has allowed Audi to bypass high import duties on larger displacement engines, offer the car at a competitive price, and become a leader in the imported luxury car segment. In Malaysia, the Audi A3 was launched in 2014 and sold as two models - a 1.4-liter with 7-speed S-Tronic automatic transmission, and a 1.8-liter with 6-speed DSG and Quattro all-wheel drive. The facelifted version has yet to be launched. In Singapore, the Audi A3 sedan and Sportback are currently available as 1.0-liter turbo models only.

A3 Cabrio (2013–2020)

The A3 cabriolet model was offered starting in 2014. It has a three-box body style and a larger boot than the previous model (320 litres versus 260).

A3 Sportback (2013–2020)

Other features include a choice of 13 body colours (three solid finishes, eight metallic finishes, and two pearl-effect finishes), an optional high-gloss package adding accents around the windows (standard with the Ambiente trim line), six-speed manual transmission (optional S-Tronic) for all engine models, 16 or 17-inch wheels depending on trim line (optional 18-inch wheels), Audi drive select (standard with Ambition) with optional S-Tronic, and optional electromagnetic damper control system.

German models went on sale in February 2013. Early models include 1.4 TFSI (122 PS), 1.8 TFSI (180 PS), 1.8 TFSI quattro (180 PS), and 1.6 TDI. 1.2 TFSI (105 PS), 1.4 TFSI (140 PS), 2.0 TDI (150 PS), 2.0 TDI quattro (150 PS), and 2.0 TDI (184 PS) were available in later date.

A3 Sportback g-tron (2013–2020)

It is a version of the A3 Sportback with 1.4 TFSI (110 PS) engine powered by compressed natural gas or Audi e-gas synthetic methane; gas tank made of gas-impermeable polyamide polymer, carbon fiber reinforced polymer (CFRP), glass fiber reinforced polymer; and an electronic gas pressure regulator. The synthetic methane was produced by waste product from a nearby Werlte biogas plant operated by power utility EWE.

A3 Sportback e-tron (2014–2018, 2020)

The plug-in hybrid concept car was unveiled at the 2013 Geneva Motor Show. In May 2013 Audi confirmed its decision to produce a plug-in hybrid version of the A3, the Audi A3 Sportback e-tron, which was scheduled for retail sales in Europe by late 2013, and by mid 2014 in the U.S. and the UK. The A3 e-tron shares the same plug-in hybrid powertrain used in both the Volkswagen Golf GTE and Passat GTE. To charge the A3 e-tron, the Audi four rings logo is pulled along to reveal a charging socket.

According to Audi the car has an average fuel efficiency of 188 mpg equivalent and  emissions of 35 g/km.

After some delays, the A3 Sportback e-Tron went on sale across Europe in August 2014. The first 227 units were registered in Germany in August 2014. , global sales totaled 12,994 units, of which, 12,945 units were registered in Europe, and 49 units in the United States, where deliveries began in December 2015.

Audi discontinued the A3 PHEV Sportback e-tron in Europe in November 2018. However, the model was briefly re-introduced at the end of 2019 for MY20, now called A3 Sportback 40 e-tron under Audi's new naming scheme. The revised A3 e-tron in the UK featured a different level of specification, losing the previously standard LED headlights but gaining Audi's virtual cockpit as standard. The revised model featured the same battery and drivetrain as before, now rated at 22 miles of electric range under the new WLTP test.

S3 (2013–2020)

It features new pistons with stronger bolts and new rings, as well as reinforced connecting rods with new mounts transferring the power to the crankshaft. The cylinder head is made of a new lightweight aluminium alloy designed with high strength and temperature resistance in mind.

RS 3 (2015–2020)

Details for the RS 3 Sportback were revealed in December 2014. The RS 3 Sportback is equipped with 7-speed dual clutch S tronic transmission and quattro all-wheel drive system. Scott Keogh of Audi of America said in April 2015 that he's "confident" we'll see the car come to the United States.

In 2017, the RS3 sedan or saloon was added to the line-up. The RS3 can be ordered with a fixed-suspension or an adjustable magnetic damper. Depending on the country, the RS3 can be purchased with different optional packages. For example, the Black Optic package includes high-gloss black 19-inch wheels, high-gloss black outside mirror covers, and a high-gloss black trunk lip spoiler, while the Dynamic package consists of titanium 19-inch wheels with summer performance tires, red brake calipers, and a sport exhaust system.

2016 facelift

After four years, the third-generation Audi A3 was given a facelift for the model year 2016, which also coincided with the 20th anniversary of the A3 name. The facelifted model was first unveiled through a set of official images in April 2016. The new A3 sedan was given significant cosmetic updates, which were inline with the automaker's new design philosophy. As a result, the 2017 Audi A3 featured the Matrix LED headlamps that were earlier seen in the A8 flagship sedan and the R8 supercar. The front grille was also given a refreshed treatment that made the A3 look like the A4. Changes on the sides and rear were minimal, with only the taillights getting optional LEDs. There were multiple updates on the interior as well, with a fully digital 12.3-inch instrument cluster screen placed behind a revised steering wheel available as an optional upgrade. Sold in Europe and released in the United States for the 2016 model year.

Safety

Euro NCAP tested a third-generation Audi A3, 3-door hatchback with front airbags, side airbags, seatbelt pretensioners and load limiters as standard and scored it accordingly:

Engines

Fourth generation (Typ 8Y; 2020)

The new A3 was unveiled online in 2020.

The new interior and exterior styling is heavily inspired by Lamborghini, LED headlights and taillights, with the option of Matrix and Laser LED headlights. It shares the MQB evo platform with other Audi models, and with the Volkswagen Golf Mk8, SEAT Leon Mk4, and Škoda Octavia Mk4.

It is 3 centimetres longer and wider when compared to the outgoing model while keeping the wheelbase length the same, trunk cargo space is 380 litres with the seats up, and 1200 litres with the seats folded down. It has a drag coefficient of 0.28, and is powered by 1.0-liter 3-cylinder gasoline turbocharged engine with 110 hp, 1.5-litre  with 150 hp, 2.0-liter TDI with 116 hp or 150 hp.

There is also a new 2.0-liter Quattro version in both gasoline and diesel variants. It also has reduced cargo space (320 litres instead of the 380 litres in the other A3 variants) due to the Quattro four-wheel-drive system.

Similarly it has reduced cargo space due to the Quattro four-wheel-drive system.

Like the previous generation, the new S3 also comes as a saloon/sedan.

The new A3 Sedan was revealed on 21 April 2020, with the front fascia similar to that of the A3 Sportback. Compared with its predecessor, the new A3 Sedan is 4 cm longer (4.50 meters), 2 cm wider (1.82 meters), and 1 cm taller (1.43 meters). However, the wheelbase remains unchanged.

This generation of the A3 sedan is not expected to arrive in North America until late 2021, as a 2022 model.
North America will not get the Sportback e-Tron like before. In the countries that will receive The PHEV A3 will no longer be called The e-tron because this name is reserved for electric Audi cars. Instead, it is called The TFSIe. There are 2 version of the TFSIe, called the "40" and the "45".

This generation of the A3 sportback is arriving in Thailand this November 2021, as a 2022 model.

Audi RS 3 

It gets a seven-speed dual-clutch automatic, or an electric S-Tronic gearbox.
It also gets the new MMI infotainment system, with a 10.25 or 12.3-inch digital instrument cluster, and a secondary screen of 10.1-inches.

Sales

Awards and accolades
 (2014) World Car of the Year
 (2013) What Car? Small Family Car of the Year
 (2013) What Car? Car of the Year
 (2006) South African Car of the Year
 (2000) Brazilian Car of the Year
 (1997, 1999, 2000) Auto motor und sport readers' poll Best Car award
 (1997) Autozeitung "Auto Trophy" award
 (1996) Bild am Sonntag "Golden Steering Wheel" award

Motorsport

Münnich Motorsport used an S3 in the FIA World Rallycross Championship and the FIA European Rallycross Championship.

Robb Holland used an S3 Saloon to compete in the 2014 British Touring Car Championship season under the NGTC regs. Currently AmD Tuning field two S3 Saloon's for Ant Whorton-Eales and Ollie Jackson.

Audi's motorsports brand, Audi Sport, produced an RS3 LMS beginning in 2017. The car is built to TCR International Series regulations.

After the release of 4th generation of Audi A3; the model of RS 3 LMS TCR is also changed, and it will firstly start to race in 2021 WTCR season.

References

 "A7, A5, and A3 Joins Even Numbers", an article in the "News" section on page thirty-eight of the June 2004 issue of Motor Trend
 Audi A3 Owner's Manual (English/UK edition) (2000 Audi AG)

External links

A3
Compact cars
Euro NCAP small family cars
Hatchbacks
Sedans
Station wagons
Convertibles
Front-wheel-drive vehicles
All-wheel-drive vehicles
Cars powered by VR engines
Touring cars
Plug-in hybrid vehicles
Cars introduced in 1996
2000s cars
2010s cars
2020s cars